Football Club Romania is a football club based in Cheshunt, Hertfordshire, England.

History
The club was established in August 2006 by Ionuţ Vintilă, an immigrant from Romania, with the team name reflecting the Romanian immigrant background of most of the team. They started in Sunday league football, initially playing in the Sunday London Weekend League. After winning their division at the first attempt, the club switched to Saturday football, joining the Essex Business Houses League in 2008. In 2010 they joined Division One (Central and East) of the Middlesex County League. After finishing as runners-up in their first season in the division, they were promoted to the Premier Division. In 2011–12 the club finished as runners-up in the Premier Division, but were unable to be promoted due to ground grading regulations.

In 2012–13 the club entered the FA Vase for the first time, beating Tring Athletic in the first qualifying round, before losing 7–0 at Hoddesdon Town in the next round. In the same season the club finished second in the Premier Division for a second successive season and were promoted to the Essex Senior League after a groundsharing agreement with Cheshunt allowed them to meet the ground grading regulations. The season also saw them win the Middlesex County League's Open Cup with a 3–1 win over Bratham in the final. In 2014–15 the club entered the FA Cup for the first time, reaching the second qualifying round, where they lost to Sutton United.

The 2017–18 season saw FC Romania finish third in the Essex Senior League. After Shaw Lane folded, they were promoted to the South Central Division of the Isthmian League as part of the league readjustments. At the end of the 2020–21 season, which was curtailed due to the COVID-19 pandemic, they were transferred to Division One Central of the Southern League.

Ground
The club originally played on Hackney Marshes, before moving to the Low Hall Recreation Ground in Walthamstow when they moved up to the Essex Business Houses League. When the club joined the Middlesex County League they began playing at Leyton Sports Centre. In 2012 the club began groundsharing at the Cheshunt Stadium.

Honours
Middlesex County League
Open Cup winners 2012–13

Records
Best FA Cup performance: Second qualifying round, 2014–15, 2017–18, 2018–19
Best FA Trophy performance: Second qualifying round, 2020–21
Best FA Vase performance: Fourth round, 2015–16

See also
F.C. Romania players
F.C. Romania managers

References

External links
Official website

 
Football clubs in England
Football clubs in Hertfordshire
2006 establishments in England
Association football clubs established in 2006
Romanian diaspora
Diaspora sports clubs in the United Kingdom
Essex Business Houses Football League
Middlesex County Football League
Essex Senior Football League
Isthmian League
Southern Football League clubs
Diaspora association football clubs in England